Vehicle registration places of Ivory Coast use European standard sizes. Ivory Coast plates are unique because of the color scheme and the location of the identifier band. The registration identifier consists of four digits followed by two letters, then two digits. The final two digits indicate the region of origination of the vehicle.

Military plates white on black, with the registration identifier preceded by the flag of Ivory Coast.

References

Ivory Coast
Ivory Coast transport-related lists